Mannington and its southerly neighbour Lower Mannington are hamlets in the English county of Dorset. The village is home to a large electricity substation on the National Grid 400kV transmission network.

External links 

Hamlets in Dorset